Bolberry Down is a clifftop area on the coast of Devon, England. The headland of Bolt Tail lies to the west and Bolt Head and the town of Salcombe to the east. It is one of the longest coastal areas owned by the National Trust and lies within the South Devon Area of Outstanding Natural Beauty.

The down provides views across the English Channel.

Bolberry Down was the site of a Decca Navigator station in the SOUTH WEST BRITISH 1B chain which operated from 1952 until 31 March 2000, covering the south-west approaches. The visible sign of this system were three 150ft tubular masts and these were located to the east of the access road to Bolberry Down, together with the former bungalows for the staff. One mast remains in use today for other purposes.

References

External links
 Bolberry Down at South Devon AONB

Geography of Devon
National Trust properties in Devon